Jean Henri Zuber (24 June 1844 – 7 April 1909) was a French landscape painter. He was born in Rixheim, in the Haut-Rhin département of Alsace. He served in the French navy from 1863 to 1868, and took part in the French campaign against Korea in 1866.

Painting
Zuber entered the atelier of Charles Gleyre in 1868 and was admitted to the Salon des artistes français in 1869. In 1873 he published an account of his experiences in Korea, with his own illustrations, in the Hachette periodical Le Tour du Monde.

From 1884 he is listed as a member of the Société d'aquarellistes français or "French society of watercolourists".

In 1886, he was made a knight of France's Légion d'honneur.

Zuber died in Paris on 7 April 1909.

References

See also

 Legion of Honour
 List of Legion of Honour recipients by name (Z)
 Legion of Honour Museum

French landscape painters
People from Haut-Rhin
Chevaliers of the Légion d'honneur
1909 deaths
1844 births
19th-century French painters
French male painters
French Navy personnel
Painters from Alsace
19th-century French male artists